The Socialist Party of New Jersey (SPNJ) is the state chapter of the Socialist Party USA in the U.S. state of New Jersey.

The Socialist Party of New Jersey engages in both electoral politics and non-electoral activism.  Electoral campaigns include Greg Pason's 2009 run for Governor of New Jersey and Pat Noble's 2011 run for the Board of Chosen Freeholders in Monmouth County, New Jersey.  Non-electoral activism includes anti-racist actions in cooperation with Residents Against Racism, support for unions and unionization in cooperation with the Industrial Workers of the World (IWW) and other unions, anti-war and anti-imperialist agitation, and support for feminism and women's rights.

In 2014, the SPNJ declared victory in a lawsuit (Noble v. State) against the State of New Jersey over the State preventing the Party from having voter registration rights. The SPNJ joins eight other political parties who have voter registration, six of which are minor/alternative parties and also had to file a lawsuit to receive voter registration abilities.

The Socialist Party of New Jersey has two active locals, a Northern New Jersey local headquartered in Montclair, and a Central New Jersey local headquartered in Red Bank.

Organization
The Socialist Party of New Jersey is governed by a State Executive Committee (SEC), elected to two-year terms at a state convention on odd years. The state convention elects one to two State Chairs, as well as a State Secretary and State Treasurer. Additionally, each chartered local is invited to elect one representative to sit on the SEC as a voting member.

Elected officials
Pat Noble, member of the Red Bank Regional High School Board of Education since January 2nd, 2013

Former candidates

Gubernatorial candidates
2013: Maynor Moreno/Stephanie Gussin- Write-in candidacy (votes not counted)
2009: Greg Pason/Costantino Rozzo- 2,085 votes (0.09%)
2005: Costantino Rozzo- 2,078 votes (0.09%)
2001: Costantino Rozzo- 1,537 votes (0.07%)
1997: Greg Pason- 2,800 votes (0.12%)

US Senate candidates
2012: Greg Pason- 2,249 votes (0.07%)
2006: Greg Pason- 2,490 votes (0.11%)
2002: Greg Pason- 2,702 votes (0.13%)
2000: Greg Pason- 3,365 votes (0.11%)

US House of Representatives candidates
2008, District 2: Constantio Rozzo- 648 votes (0.23%)
2006, District 2: Willie Norwood- 385 votes (0.21%)
2004, District 2: Constantio Rozzo- 595 votes (0.22%)
2004, District 5: Greg Pason- 574 votes (0.19%)
2002, District 2: Constantio Rozzo- 771 votes (0.46%)
2000, District 2: Constantio Rozzo- 788 votes (0.34%)
1994, District 9: Greg Pason- 1,490 votes (0.93%) (on ballot as "Independent")
1984, District 3: Lawrence D. Erickson- 907 votes (0.40%)
1982, District 3: Lawrence D. Erickson- 436 votes (0.26%)
1980, District 3: Lawrence D. Erickson- 643 votes (0.30%)

State Assembly candidates
2005, District 2: Sharin Chiorazzo- 832 votes (0.77%) and Willie Norwood- 665 (0.61%) (two candidates elected)
2005, District 10: Scott Baier- 584 votes (0.46%) (two candidates elected)
2003, District 1: Constantino Rozzo- 768 votes (0.81%) (two candidates elected)
1997, District 27: John-Martin Winter- 1,051 votes (1.50%) (two candidates elected)
1995, District 27: John-Martin Winter- 478 votes (1.07%) (two candidates elected)

County/local candidates
2018 Red Bank Regional High School Board of Education: Pat Noble- 2,539 votes (98.60%) (non-partisan race)
2015 Red Bank Regional High School Board of Education: Pat Noble- 1,103 votes (97.78%) (non-partisan race)
2012 Red Bank Regional High School Board of Education: Pat Noble- 1,187 votes (54.47%) (non-partisan race)
2011 Monmouth County Board of Chosen Freeholders: Pat Noble- 1,389 votes (0.67%)
2008 Madison Borough Council: Peter Moody- Write-in candidacy (votes not counted)
2006 Mayor of Paterson: Tommy Silva- 205 votes (1.12%) (non-partisan race)

Presidential nominee results
Since 1976, the Socialist Party USA has run a candidate for President of the United States. The party's nominee has been on the ballot in New Jersey in 1976, 1980, 1984, 1988, 2000, 2004 and 2008. The candidate who has received the highest vote total in New Jersey was Willa Kenoyer in 1988.

External links
SPNJ Official Website
Socialist Party of Northern New Jersey
Central New Jersey Socialist Party
Residents Against Racism

References

New Jersey
New Jersey
Political parties in New Jersey
New Jersey